Devin Brooks (born August 27, 1992) is an American professional basketball player who currently plays for Byblos Club of the Lebanese Basketball League.

References

External links
 Eurobasket Profile
 RealGM Profile
 FIBA Profile
 ESPN Profile
 Proballers Profile
 Basketball-Reference Profile

1992 births
Living people
African-American basketball players
American expatriate basketball people in Bulgaria
American expatriate basketball people in Estonia
American expatriate basketball people in Lebanon
American expatriate basketball people in North Macedonia
American expatriate basketball people in Serbia
American men's basketball players
Basketball players from New York City
BC Balkan Botevgrad players
Creighton Bluejays men's basketball players
Iowa Western Reivers men's basketball players
KK Dynamic players
Long Island Nets players
People from Harlem
Point guards
Rapla KK players
Sportspeople from Manhattan
Windy City Bulls players
21st-century African-American sportspeople